Lubondaie Airport  is an airstrip serving  Lubondaie, a village in the Kasaï-Central Province (formerly Kasai-Occidental) of the Democratic Republic of the Congo.

See also

Transport in the Democratic Republic of the Congo
List of airports in the Democratic Republic of the Congo

References

External links
OpenStreetMap - Lubondaie
OurAirports - Lubondaie
FallingRain - Lubondaie Airport

Airports in Kasaï-Central